Victor Woodrow Wertz (February 9, 1925 – July 7, 1983) was an American professional baseball first baseman and outfielder. He had a 17-year Major League Baseball (MLB) career from 1947 to 1963. He played for the Detroit Tigers, St. Louis Browns / Baltimore Orioles, Cleveland Indians, Boston Red Sox, and Minnesota Twins; all teams within the American League.

Career
Wertz was signed as a free agent by the Detroit Tigers in 1942, and played in their minor league system until making his major league debut in 1947. He hit for the cycle on September 14, 1947, while in his rookie season with Detroit.

Wertz finished in the Top 15 in MVP voting five times: 1949 (10th), 1950 (10th), 1956 (9th), 1957 (6th), and 1960 (14th).

Wertz was among the Top 10 in the American League in home runs in 1949 (20), 1950 (27), 1951 (27), 1952 (23), 1953 (19), 1956 (32), and 1957 (28).  His 1956 total of 32 home runs was 2nd best in the AL.  For his career, he hit 266 home runs and 1,178 RBIs with a .469 career slugging average and a .364 career on-base percentage.

He was elected to the American League All-Star team four times (1949, 1951, 1952 and 1957). He missed part of the 1955 season when stricken with a nonparalytic form of polio but returned in 1956.

Wertz started 1954 as a member of the newly formed Baltimore Orioles, who had moved from St.Louis where they played had played as the Browns.  The Orioles played in the then mammoth Memorial Stadium that frustrated the power-hitting left-handed hitter.  On June 1, 1954, he was traded by the Baltimore Orioles to the Cleveland Indians for Bob Chakales. When he was traded he was hitting only .202 with one home run after 29 games.  He immediately became the starting first baseman for the Indians replacing Bill Glynn who held down the position the previous year.
In the 1954 World Series, Wertz hit a long fly ball that Willie Mays caught, known as "The Catch".

After he retired from playing, Wertz kept a photo of “The Catch” in his office at his beer distribution company and explained he had no negative feelings about being remembered for hitting a deep fly out. "I'm very proud that I'm associated with it," Wertz told UPI in 1979. "I look at it this way: If that ball Willie caught had been a home run or a triple, how many people would've remembered me? Not many. This way, everybody who meets me for the first time always identifies me with Willie's catch, and that makes me feel good."

Vic Wertz Field at the Berks County Youth Recreation Facility in Pennsylvania is named in his honor. The field was dedicated on April 19, 2013.

Personal life
Wertz was a World War II veteran. During and after his baseball career, Wertz worked in the Detroit area beer distribution business . When he retired to Mount Clemens, Michigan, he formed "Wertz Warriors", a group of sportsmen who raised funds for the Special Olympics Winter Games. He was the founder of an 800-mile snowmobile endurance ride, run annually in Michigan starting in 1982 to benefit the Special Olympics.

Wertz died during heart surgery at Detroit's Harper Hospital on the morning of July 7, 1983. Surgeons were performing a coronary bypass and replacing a valve in his heart after he had suffered a heart attack the previous day. He is buried at Holy Sepulchre Cemetery in Southfield, Michigan.

See also

 List of Major League Baseball career home run leaders
 List of Major League Baseball career runs batted in leaders
 List of Major League Baseball players to hit for the cycle

References

Further reading

 Vic Wertz - Baseballbiography.com

External links

Vic Wertz at SABR (Baseball BioProject)

1925 births
1983 deaths
American League All-Stars
American military personnel of World War II
Baltimore Orioles players
Baseball players from Pennsylvania
Boston Red Sox players
Buffalo Bisons (minor league) players
Cleveland Indians players
Detroit Tigers players
Detroit Tigers scouts
Major League Baseball first basemen
Major League Baseball right fielders
Minnesota Twins players
St. Louis Browns players
Sportspeople from York, Pennsylvania
Winston-Salem Twins players